Palaeoplatoda is a genus from the Ediacaran biota. It is a soft-bodied organism with a segmented body that resembles Dickinsonia, another Ediacaran organism.

Description 
Palaeoplatoda has a leaf-like, segmented body, that is similar to Dickinsonia, but with a narrower middle and more curved frame. Its body is 7 centimeters long and 3 centimeters wide, with each of the segments measuring about 0.06 centimeters in length. Also, Palaeoplatoda has a body with a convex shape and is bilaterally symmetric. This species has high elasticity due to its irregular, deformed body margins. On its ventral side, one can see thin ridges that generally diverge from the center and all curve in a similar direction.

Diversity 
The only known species of Palaeoplatoda is Palaeplatoda segmentata.

Discovery 
Mikhail A. Fedonkin discovered and described P. segmentata in 1979. The discovery was made near the Syuz’ma river in the Onega peninsula in the White Sea Region of Russia. The fossil outcrop is interstratified sandstone and is a part of the Valdai unit of the Verkhova formation.

Distribution 
Most Palaeoplatoda specimens are found in the White Sea region of Russia. Specifically, 12 specimens were found on the coastal shore of the Verkhovka formation, near the Syuz’ma River. Palaeoplatoda specimens found in the White Sea region are found in thick channelized, interstratified sandstone layers and in high-energy channel systems. Other specimens have been identified in the Halkal Shale unit in Bhim Basin, India.

See also 
 List of Ediacaran genera

References 

Ediacaran life